Air California, later renamed AirCal, was an American airline company, founded by William E. Myers and Bill Perrera, a pair of Orange County businessmen. It began as an intrastate airline operating solely within California.

Air California was headquartered in Newport Beach, California.  The airline's "home" airport was Orange County Airport, now known as John Wayne Airport.

Scheduled passenger operations commenced on January 16, 1967. Air California's initial route was a nonstop flight between Orange County Airport (SNA) and San Francisco International Airport (SFO), a previously unserved route. Two Lockheed L-188 Electra turboprops were used to make five daily round-trip flights.

Following the federal Airline Deregulation Act in 1978, Air California expanded its service to several destinations in neighboring states. In the 1980s, in addition to its California routes, it was flying to Chicago (ORD), Seattle (SEA), Anchorage (ANC), and Vancouver, B.C. (YVR) as well as to other destinations in the western U.S.

The airline was renamed AirCal in 1981, and it was merged into American Airlines in 1987.

History

In April 1967, Air California was operating 48 nonstop Lockheed L-188 Electra propjet flights a week from Orange County (SNA) to San Francisco (SFO). The fare was $14.85 plus 5% tax. It added Orange County (SNA) to San Jose (SJC) and Oakland (OAK) flights around the beginning of 1968.

By May 1968, the airline was operating 92 flights per week from SNA to SFO, primarily using Douglas DC-9-10 twin jets, as well as 50 flights a week from SNA to SJC, with most continuing on to OAK. By January 1969, Boeing 737s had taken over all flights, with the Electras and DC-9s being removed from the fleet.

By 1976, Air California was operating nonstop intrastate jet service between Orange County and San Francisco, San Jose, Oakland, Sacramento, San Diego and Palm Springs; between San Diego and Oakland and San Jose; between Ontario and Oakland and San Jose; and between Palm Springs and San Francisco, San Jose and Oakland.

In the late 1970s, Air California's fleet was composed mainly of Boeing 737-200 jetliners. Two Boeing 737-100s were added in 1977–1978. It also flew two Douglas DC-9-10s in 1968, which were leased while Air California was awaiting its new 737s.

In 1975, Air California resumed flying Lockheed Electra propjets in order to serve Lake Tahoe Airport since this airfield had banned scheduled passenger airline jet flights, a ban lasting until the early 1980s. The Electras were retired again when Air California dropped Lake Tahoe as a destination in 1979, with the airline then becoming an all-jet air carrier.

Marketing

In the early to mid-1970s, Air California offered school field trips for inner-city school children in Los Angeles to Sacramento at $25 per ticket. The school children would be taken on a tour of the California State Capitol, Governor's Mansion, and Sutter's Fort.

When the airline introduced the new McDonnell Douglas MD-80, one could (for several hours at Burbank Airport) purchase discounted one-way passes (good for one year) for flights to San Jose and Oakland. The pass price was $9.80 one way/$19.60 round trip, with a purchase limit of four round-trip passes. Later that year, San Francisco was added to the pass program as well.

Following the federal Airline Deregulation Act of 1978, Air California started flights to Las Vegas and Reno, its first routes outside of the state. It then offered service to Portland, Oregon, and then Seattle, Washington, and Phoenix, Arizona. The growing airline then became a takeover target for larger, national air carriers.

AirCal
In 1981 Air California's owner Westgate, undergoing bankruptcy proceedings, agreed to sell Air California to a newly formed company, AirCal Investments, owned by real estate developers William Lyon and George Argyros, for 61.5 million. The airline changed its name to AirCal and adopted a bright new logo and image, including a new wardrobe for its employees by fashion designer Mary McFadden.

AirCal served as the title sponsor of the 1982 CART Indy car race at Riverside International Raceway.

During the 1980s, AirCal had a small fleet of Boeing 737s (series -100, -200 and -300 aircraft); seven McDonnell Douglas MD-80s; and  six British Aerospace BAe 146-200s. The BAe 146 allowed AirCal to increase flights at noise-sensitive Orange County Airport since this British-built jet was quieter than other jets. The airline recommenced flights to Lake Tahoe in the early 1980s with jet service, first with MD-80s and later with Boeing 737-300s. In early 1985, the airline was operating nonstop MD-80 jet service between Lake Tahoe and Los Angeles (LAX), San Francisco (SFO), and San Jose (SJC).

By May 1987, AirCal had introduced new flights serving Chicago (ORD), Anchorage (ANC), and its only international destination, Vancouver, British Columbia, Canada (YVR).

AirCal alliance with Muse Air

In 1984, AirCal partnered with Texas-based Muse Air. Connecting flights between the two airlines were published in their respective timetables.

The AirCal January 1, 1984, system timetable listed connections to Muse Air flights from Los Angeles (LAX) and Ontario (ONT) to Austin (AUS), Houston Hobby Airport (HOU), Midland/Odessa (MAF), and New Orleans (MSY). The April 29, 1984, Muse Air system timetable listed AirCal connections from Los Angeles (LAX) to San Francisco (SFO), Oakland (OAK), San Jose (SJC), Sacramento (SMF), Reno (RNO), Portland (PDX), and Seattle (SEA).

Acquisition and merger into American Airlines

AirCal was acquired by AMR Corp., the parent company of American Airlines, in 1987. American continued to fly many former AirCal Boeing 737s as well as the BAe 146s, which at that time were both new types in American's fleet.

American operated from its new hub at Norman Y. Mineta San Jose International Airport (SJC) until it transferred the bulk of its San Jose operations to Reno Air in the mid-1990s.

American continued to operate former AirCal Boeing 737-300s into Lake Tahoe (TVL) until it turned over all Lake Tahoe service to their regional affiliate American Eagle, which was operating small, commuter turboprop aircraft at that time.

All eight former AirCal Boeing 737-3A4s were later operated by Southwest Airlines.  AirCal also had ordered a ninth 737-3A4 (never delivered), which eventually also found its way into the Southwest Airlines fleet. As of April 2017, Southwest had retired all of the former AirCal fleet: N679AA, the last Boeing 737-300 in service, was stored in February 2012.

Incidents and accidents
In 1981, an AirCal Boeing 737-200 crashed while attempting to land at John Wayne International Airport around sunset on Tuesday, February 17. AirCal Flight 336 was a scheduled flight from San Jose International Airport to John Wayne International Airport. Around 48 minutes into the flight, the crew received clearance for a visual approach to land on runway 19R. As Flight 336 was approaching, another AirCal flight, Flight 931, received clearance to take off from runway 19R.

The controller recognized the potential danger of a collision between the two aircraft and ordered Flight 931 to abort takeoff and instructed Flight 336 to go around. Flight 931 aborted its takeoff, however, Flight 336 did not go around and instead landed on the runway with the landing gear retracted. The aircraft left the runway surface around  past the runway threshold, skidded another  before finally coming to rest  to the right of the centerline. All passengers and crew members survived the crash. The Boeing 737-293 aircraft, registered N468AC, was damaged beyond repair and consequently written off.

On June 5, 1986, an AirCal 737 flying from Los Angeles to Portland came within 100 feet of a private plane before the AirCal pilot banked to avoid a collision. No crew or passengers were injured during the incident.

Destinations

Destinations in May 1987

AirCal's May 1, 1987, system timetable listed the following destinations shortly before it was merged into American Airlines:

 Anchorage, AK (ANC)
 Burbank, CA – now Bob Hope Airport (BUR)
 Chicago, IL – O'Hare Airport (ORD)
 Long Beach, CA (LGB)
 Los Angeles (LAX)
 Oakland, CA (OAK)
 Ontario, CA (ONT)
 Orange County, CA – now John Wayne Airport (SNA)
 Portland, OR (PDX)
 Reno, NV (RNO)
 Sacramento, CA (SMF)
 San Diego, CA (SAN) 
 San Francisco, CA (SFO)
 San Jose, CA (SJC)
 Seattle, WA (SEA)
 South Lake Tahoe, CA (TVL)
 Vancouver, B.C., Canada (YVR) – only international destination served by the airline

Previously served destinations

Air California/AirCal previously served these destinations during its existence:

 Fresno, CA (FAT)
 Las Vegas, NV (LAS)
 Monterey, CA (MRY)
 Palm Springs, CA (PSP)
 Phoenix, AZ (PHX)

Fleet
Among other aircraft types, Air California/AirCal operated the following jet aircraft during its existence:

Air California/AirCal also operated six British Aerospace BAe 146-200s, eight Boeing 737-300s, seven Lockheed L-188 Electra turboprops and seven McDonnell Douglas MD-80s.

Fleet before merger with American Airlines
Shortly before being merged into American Airlines, AirCal was operating the following jet aircraft types in scheduled passenger service in 1986 and 1987:

 Boeing 737-100
 Boeing 737-200
 Boeing 737-300
 British Aerospace BAe 146-200
 McDonnell Douglas MD-80

See also 
 List of defunct airlines of the United States

References

External links 

 Orange County Memories, AirCal Airlines
 Air California and AirCal History

Defunct regional airlines of the United States
Defunct companies based in Greater Los Angeles
Companies based in Newport Beach, California
Airlines established in 1967
Airlines disestablished in 1987
1967 establishments in California
1987 disestablishments in California
1987 mergers and acquisitions
Airlines based in California
Defunct airlines of the United States